The Vedea is a river in southern Romania that flows from the Cotmeana Plateau and empties into the Danube. It has a total length of 224 km, of which 33 km is regulated. Its drainage basin area is 5,430 km2.

It flows in Argeș, Olt and Teleorman counties. The towns Alexandria and Roșiorii de Vede lie in the vicinity of the river.

The name of the river is Dacian in origin, from Indo-European *wed, "water".

Towns and villages

The following towns and villages are situated along the river Vedea, from source to mouth: Făgețelu, Spineni, Tătulești, Optași, Corbu, Nicolae Titulescu, Văleni, Stejaru, Roșiorii de Vede, Vedea, Peretu, Plosca, Mavrodin, Buzescu, Alexandria, Poroschia, Brânceni, Smârdioasa, Cervenia, Conțești, Bragadiru, Bujoru.

Tributaries

The following rivers are tributaries of the Vedea (from source to mouth):

Left: Ciorâca, Tișar, Vedița, Cupen, Cotmeana, Tecuci, Burdea, Pârâul Câinelui, Teleorman
Right: Plapcea, Dorofei, Bratcov, Bărâcea, Nanov, Izvoarele, Rojiștea

References

Rivers of Romania
 
Rivers of Argeș County
Rivers of Olt County
Rivers of Teleorman County